Eddie Ioane (born June 2, 1966) is a Samoan rugby union player. He played as lock.

Career
His first match for Samoa was against Tonga, at Apia, on June 17, 1990. He was also part of the 1991 Rugby World Cup roster. He retired after the World Cup. In the NPC he played for Auckland.

Personal life
He is married with the former Black Fern Sandra Wihongi and he is the father of Akira and Rieko Ioane, both of them playing for the All Blacks Sevens and for the All Blacks. Another of his family members is Steven Ioane, who also plays rugby union.

In 2016, Ioane was named president of his former club Ponsonby RFC.

References

External links
 Eddie Ioane International Statistics

1966 births
Living people
Sportspeople from Apia
Samoan rugby union players
Expatriate rugby union players in New Zealand
Rugby union locks
Samoa international rugby union players
Samoan expatriate sportspeople in New Zealand
Samoan expatriate rugby union players
Auckland rugby union players
Expatriate rugby union players in Japan
Samoan expatriate sportspeople in Japan
Black Rams Tokyo players